Cook County Board of Commissioners 1st district is a electoral district for the Cook County Board of Commissioners.

The district was established in 1994, when the board transitioned from holding elections in individual districts, as opposed to the previous practice of holding a set of two at-large elections (one for ten seats from the city of Chicago and another for seven seats from suburban Cook County).

Geography
Since its inception, the district has covered parts of the West Side of Chicago and parts of the western suburbs of Cook County.

1994 boundaries
In its initial 1994 iteration, the district encompassed parts of the West Side of Chicago as well as the western suburbs of Cook County.

2001 redistricting
New boundaries were adopted in August 2001, with redistricting taking place following the 2000 United States Census.

In regards to townships and equivalent jurisdictions, the district's redistricted boundaries included portions of the city of Chicago, as well as portions of Oak Park and Proviso Townships.

The parts of Chicago which the district encompassed were on the West Side, including the neighborhood of Austin. Other municipalities included Bellwood, Broadview, Maywood, and Oak Park.

2012 redistricting
The district currently, as redistricted in 2012 following the 2010 United States Census, includes parts of Bellwood, Broadview, Chicago, Forest Park, Hillside, Maywood, North Riverside, Oak Park, and Westchester.

In regards to townships and equivalent jurisdictions, it includes portions of the city of Chicago, and portions of Oak Park and Proviso Townships.

The parts of Chicago encompassed are on the city's West Side.

The district is 28.93 square miles (18,516.79 acres).

Politics
All commissioners representing this district, since its inception, have been Democrats.

The district has strongly favored Democrats.

List of commissioners representing the district

Election results

|-
| colspan=16 style="text-align:center;" |Cook County Board of Commissioners 1st district general elections
|-
!Year
!Winning candidate
!Party
!Vote (pct)
!Opponent
!Party
! Vote (pct)
|-
|1994
| |Danny K. Davis
| |Democratic
| | 42,530
|Text style="background:#D2B48C | Gwendolyn Stanford-Jones
|Text style="background:#D2B48C |Harold Washington Party
|Text style="background:#D2B48C | 
|-
|1998
| |Earlean Collins
| | Democratic
| |62,134 (88.80%)
| | Luther Franklin Spence
| |Republican
| | 7,835 (11.20%)
|-
|2002
| |Earlean Collins
| | Democratic
| |68,055 (89.83%)
| | Robin Lee Meyer
| | Republican
| | 7,707 (10.17%)
|-
|2006
| |Earlean Collins
| | Democratic
| |69,621 (91.68%)
| | Henrietta S. Butler
| | Republican
| | 6,320 (8.32%)
|-
|2010
| |Earlean Collins
| | Democratic
| |68,890 (86.13%)
| | Ronald Lawless
| | Green
| | 11,095 (13.87%)
|-
|2014
| |Richard Boykin
| | Democratic
| |68,305 (99.36%)
| Others
| Write-ins
| 441 (0.64%)
|-
|2018
| |Brandon Johnson
| | Democratic
| |88,590 (100%)
| 
| 
| 
|-
|2022
| |Brandon Johnson
| | Democratic
| |71,077 (92.87%)
| |James Human
| | Libertarian
| |5,457 (7.13%)

References

Cook County Board of Commissioners districts
Constituencies established in 1994
1994 establishments in Illinois